Italy competed at the 2018 Mediterranean Games in Tarragona, Spain from 22 June to 1 July 2018.

Medals

Medalists
Updated to 29 June (122 medals).

Archery

Artistic Gymnastics

Athletics

Badminton

Basketball

Bowls

Boxing

Cycling

Equestrian

Fencing

Football

Golf

Judo

Karate

Rhythmic gymnastics

Rowing

Sailing

Shooting

Swimming

Triathlon

Volleyball

Waterski

Weightlifting

Wrestling

See also
 Italy at the Mediterranean Games

References

External links
   Italy National Team Medal Table at CONI website

Nations at the 2018 Mediterranean Games
2018
2018 in Italian sport